Changsha West railway station is a railway station in Wangcheng District, Changsha, Hunan, China. The station is currently undergoing expansion, and is expected to reopen in 2025. As of September 2022, trains on Changsha–Zhuzhou–Xiangtan intercity railway and Changde–Yiyang–Changsha high-speed railway pass through this station to through service to each other, without stopping here.

History
Changsha West railway station opened as the terminus of the western extension of the Changsha–Zhuzhou–Xiangtan intercity railway on 26 December 2017. From 8 May 2020, the station has been closed for refurbishment, and construction officially started on 25 August 2021.

The nearby Changsha West EMU depot, a depot on the Changyichang high-speed railway, opened on 26 December 2022.

Metro connections
A planned extension of Changsha Metro Line 2 will serve this station. Three additional planned lines are expected to serve the station.

See also
Changsha railway station
Changsha South railway station

References

Railway stations in Hunan
Railway stations opened in 2017